Star Idol Malaysia is Malaysian first ever reality drama competition. It began airing its first season on ntv7 on June 8, 2007

Hosts/Judges
There are two hosts for this show Dai Cun Yun and Tai Fun Pin. 3 judges judge the performance of contestants every week in the final round. 2 judges are official whereas 1 judge is invited

Eunice Ng
Charles Jong

References

Malaysian reality television series